Mullah Faizullah Akhund is an Afghan Taliban politician who is currently serving as acting head of the Afghanistan National Standards Authority since 14 March 2022. Akhund has also served as Deputy Minister of youth affairs at Information and Culture Ministry from 23 November 2021 to 14 March 2022.

References

Living people
Year of birth missing (living people)
Taliban government ministers of Afghanistan